Brittany Boyd-Jones ( Boyd; born June 11, 1993) is an American basketball free agent in the Women's National Basketball Association (WNBA).  She previously played for the Chicago Sky. She played college basketball for the California Golden Bears. She was selected by New York in the first round of the 2015 WNBA draft with the ninth overall pick.

Boyd grew up in Richmond, California, and attended high school in Berkeley at Berkeley High. As a senior in college, she helped Cal advance to the second round of the 2015 NCAA Tournament. Boyd averaged 13.4 points, 7.7 rebounds, 6.8 assists and 2.9 steals per game for the season, and was a semifinalist for the Naismith College Player of the Year. She was the first player in the history of the Pac-12 Conference to reach career totals of 1,400 points, 700 rebounds, 600 assists and 300 steals. 

Boyd played five seasons with New York. In 2019, she tied a career high with 33 games played while starting in a career-high 17 contests. The Liberty waived her after the season.

Career statistics
Source

References

External links

WNBA profile
California Golden Bears bio

1993 births
Living people
All-American college women's basketball players
American women's basketball players
Basketball players from California
Berkeley High School (Berkeley, California) alumni
California Golden Bears women's basketball players
Chicago Sky players
Guards (basketball)
New York Liberty draft picks
New York Liberty players
Sportspeople from Richmond, California